Mister Ed is an American television sitcom produced by Filmways that aired in syndication from January 5 to July 2, 1961, and then on CBS from October 1, 1961, to February 6, 1966. The show's title character is a talking horse which originally appeared in short stories by Walter R. Brooks.

Mister Ed is one of the few series to debut in syndication and be picked up by a major network for prime time. All 143 episodes were filmed in black and white.

Beginnings
The Mister Ed show concept was derived from a series of short stories by children's author Walter R. Brooks which began with The Talking Horse in the September 18, 1937, issue of Liberty magazine. Brooks is best known for the Freddy the Pig series of children's novels which feature talking animals that interact with humans. Arthur Lubin's secretary Sonia Chernus introduced him to the Brooks stories and is credited with developing the concept for television.

The show's concept resembles that of the Francis the Talking Mule movies in which an equine character talks to only one person, thus causing a variety of opportunities and frustrations. The first six Francis films (1950–55) were also directed by Lubin. He wanted to make a Francis television series but had been unable to secure the rights, so he optioned the Brooks' stories for television. Comedian George Burns financed the pilot for Mister Ed, which was shot at his McCadden Studio in Hollywood at a cost of $70,000. Scott McKay played Wilbur. Jack Benny was also involved behind the scenes.

Lubin was unable to sell the show to a network, so he decided to sell it into syndication first. He managed to get single-sponsor identification for the program on over 100 stations. The show was recast with Alan Young in the lead. Production began in November 1960, although Lubin did not direct early episodes because he was working in Europe on a film. The first 26 episodes were received well enough for the show to be picked up by CBS.

Synopsis
The show in effect had two leads operating as a comedy team. The title role of Mister Ed, a talking palomino, was played by gelding Bamboo Harvester and voiced by former Western film actor Allan Lane. The role of Ed's owner, a genial but somewhat klutzy architect named Wilbur Post, was played by Alan Young. The Posts resided at 17230 Valley Spring Road in the San Fernando Valley of Los Angeles. Many of the program's gags follow from Mister Ed's tendency to talk only to Wilbur, his mysteriously well cultured essence, his rapscallion tendencies, and his precociously human-like behavior that far exceeds anything those around Wilbur expect of a horse. A running gag is other characters hearing Wilbur talking to Ed and asking to whom he is talking. Another running gag centers on Wilbur being accident-prone and inadvertently causing harm to himself and others. According to Lubin, Young was chosen for the lead role because he "just seemed like the sort of guy a horse would talk to."

The other main character throughout the series is Wilbur's generally tolerant young wife, Carol (Connie Hines). The Posts also have two sets of neighbors, to whom Ed delights in making Wilbur appear as eccentric as possible. They included the Addisons, Roger (Larry Keating) and his wife Kay (Edna Skinner), who both appeared from the pilot episode until Keating's death in 1963; thereafter, Skinner continued appearing as Kay, without mention of Roger's absence, until the neighbors were recast. During this period, Kay's brother Paul Fenton (Jack Albertson), who had made occasional appearances before, appears. Following the Addisons, the Posts' new neighbors were Col. Gordon Kirkwood, USAF (Ret.), Wilbur's former commanding officer (Leon Ames), and his wife Winnie (Florence MacMichael). They appeared on the series from 1963 to 1965. In the final season, the Kirkwoods were phased out, while Carol's grumpy and uptight father, Mr. Higgins (Barry Kelley), who appeared occasionally throughout the entire series, apparently moved in with Wilbur and Carol during the final episodes. Wilbur and his father-in-law did not get along at all because Mr. Higgins loathed Wilbur, whose quirky eccentricity and klutzy, half-hearted attempts to be friendly always clashed with Mr. Higgins's emotionless and uptight personality. Carol's father never stopped trying to persuade her to divorce Wilbur, whom he often and openly referred to as a "kook" because of Wilbur's clumsiness.

Mister Ed's ability to talk was never explained and rarely contemplated on the show. In the first episode, when Wilbur expresses an inability to understand the situation, Mister Ed offers the show's only remark on the subject: "Don't try. It's bigger than both of us!"

Cast
Main cast
Allan Lane as Mister Ed (voice only)
Alan Young as Wilbur Post
Connie Hines as Carol Post
Bamboo Harvester as Mister Ed (credited as "Himself", as was standard for non-human characters in Filmways productions)

Supporting cast
Larry Keating as Roger Addison (1961–63); Seasons 1–3
Edna Skinner as Camille "Kay" Addison (1961–63); Seasons 1–3
Leon Ames as Gordon Kirkwood (1963–65); Seasons 3–5
Florence MacMichael as Winnie Kirkwood (1963–65); Seasons 3–5
Jack Albertson as Paul Fenton (guest, 1961–63); Seasons 1–3
Barry Kelley as Carol's Father, Mr. Higgins (guest, 1962–64; recurring, 1965–66)
Karen Lika as the baby

Guest stars

Several celebrity guest stars appeared as themselves during the course of the series:
 Mae West 
 Clint Eastwood in "Clint Eastwood Meets Mister Ed"
 George Burns
 Zsa Zsa Gabor
 Leo Durocher
 Johnny Crawford
 Jon Provost
 Sebastian Cabot
 Jack LaLanne appeared in a cameo near the beginning of the "Psychoanalyst Show" episode of season 1, in which Ed is watching the exercise show.
Other known performers appeared in character roles:
 Donna Douglas appeared in three episodes, first as the "Lady Godiva" model in "Busy Wife", then as Blanche in "Ed the Jumper" and later as Clint Eastwood's girlfriend in "Clint Eastwood Meets Mister Ed"
 Irene Ryan
 Raymond Bailey
 Alan Hale Jr.
 Neil Hamilton – he would go on to perform as Commissioner Gordon on Batman. 
 Hayden Rorke
 William Bendix
 Sharon Tate

Episodes

Production notes
The original, unaired pilot for the series was titled "Wilbur Pope and Mister Ed" and featured an unrelated instrumental big-band theme (with footage of Studebaker Hawk automobiles being driven underneath the opening credits). This pilot, which used a script that was nearly identical to that which would be used on the series premiere, used a totally different cast. Scott McKay played the title part of Wilbur Pope (surname later changed to "Post" prior to the series making it to air) and Sandra White played the role of Wilbur's wife.

The first horse that played Mister Ed for the first, unaired pilot episode was a chestnut gelding. The horse proved to be unruly and difficult to work with and was replaced with the horse named Bamboo Harvester (1949–1970), a crossbred gelding of American Saddlebred, Arabian and grade ancestry. A second pilot episode was filmed and Bamboo Harvester remained with the series until its cancellation.

Making Ed "talk"
Mister Ed producers left the talents that performed the title role uncredited. The show's credits listed Mister Ed as being played only by "Himself."

The voice actor for Ed's spoken lines was Allan "Rocky" Lane, a former B-movie cowboy star. Sheldon Allman provided Ed's singing voice in episodes; his solo line ("I'm Mister Ed") at the close of the show's theme song was provided by its composer, Jay Livingston. Allan Lane was alluded to by the producers only as "an actor who prefers to remain nameless." After the show became a hit, Lane campaigned the producers for screen credit but accepted a raise in salary instead.

The horse Bamboo Harvester portrayed Ed throughout the run. Ed's stablemate, a quarter horse named Pumpkin, also served as Bamboo Harvester's stunt double for the show. This horse later appeared again in the television series Green Acres.

Bamboo Harvester's trainer was Les Hilton. To create the impression that Ed was having a conversation, Hilton initially used a thread technique he had employed for Lubin's earlier Mule films; in time, though, this became unnecessary. As actor Alan Young recounted: "It was initially done by putting a piece of nylon thread in his mouth. But Ed actually learned to move his lips on cue when the trainer touched his hoof. In fact, he soon learned to do it when I stopped talking during a scene! Ed was very smart."

Reports circulated during and after the show's run that the talking effect was achieved by crew members applying peanut butter to the horse's gums. Alan Young said in later interviews that he invented the story. "Al Simon and Arthur Lubin, the producers, suggested we keep the method [of making the horse appear to talk] a secret because they thought kids would be disappointed if they found out the technical details of how it was done, so I made up the peanut butter story, and everyone bought it."

Young added that Bamboo Harvester saw trainer Les Hilton as the disciplinarian father figure. When scolded by Hilton for missing a cue, the horse would move to Young for comfort, treating the actor as a mother figure. Hilton told Young this was a positive development.

Death
There are conflicting stories involving of the death of Bamboo Harvester, the horse that played Mister Ed.

Alan Young said that he had frequently visited Harvester in retirement. He states that the horse died inadvertently from a tranquilizer, administered while he was in a stable on Sparks Street in Burbank, California, where he lived with his trainer Lester Hilton. Young says Hilton was out of town visiting relatives, and a temporary caregiver might have seen Bamboo Harvester rolling on the ground, struggling to get up. Young said Harvester was a heavy horse, and he was not always strong enough to get back on his feet without struggling. He suggests that the caregiver thought the horse was in distress, administered a tranquilizer and, for unknown reasons, the horse died within hours. The remains were cremated and scattered by Hilton in the Los Angeles area at a spot known only to him.

Another story claims that Bamboo Harvester, suffering from age-related ailments, was euthanized in 1970 with no publicity and buried at Snodgrass Farm in Tahlequah, Oklahoma.

A third story claims that after Mister Ed, Bamboo Harvester's health was failing. He suffered from arthritis and kidney problems, and had to be euthanized at the age of 19.

A different horse who died in Oklahoma in February 1979 was widely thought to be Bamboo Harvester, but this horse was, in fact, a horse that posed for the still pictures of Mister Ed used by the production company for the show's press kits. The death of this horse, unofficially known as "Mister Ed," led to death reports in the mainstream press, as well as a mock interview of the grieving Mrs. Ed on Saturday Night Live Weekend Update segment.

Theme song
The theme song, titled "Mister Ed," was written by the songwriting team of Jay Livingston and Ray Evans and sung by Livingston himself. The first seven episodes used only instrumental music to open the show; thereafter the version with lyrics was used. Livingston agreed to sing the song himself until a professional singer could be found; the producers liked the songwriter's vocals and kept them on the broadcast. During most of the show's run the ending theme song used only instrumental music. In some episodes, however, the theme song is sung during the closing credits. The theme was actually sung at the end in all but the first seven episodes. The severely shortened end credits imposed by the current distributor necessitated the use of a shortened instrumental version.

The theme song received renewed publicity twenty years after the show went off the air when Jim Brown, a preacher from South Point, Ohio, claimed in May 1986 that it contained "satanic messages" if heard in reverse. Brown and his colleague Greg Hudson claimed that the phrases "Someone sung this song for Satan" and "the source is Satan" would be audible. At their behest teenagers burned over 300 records and cassettes of secular music with alleged satanic messages. The teens did not burn a copy of Television's Greatest Hits, but Brown asserted that "Satan can be an influence whether they [the songwriters] know it or not. We don't think they did it on purpose and we're not getting down on Mister Ed."

Before the theme song begins, the sound of Mr. Ed whinnying is heard before Mr. Ed's human voice is heard saying "Hello, I'm Mr. Ed." The theme starts out with the famous lyrics "A horse is a horse/Of course, of course."

Sponsorship
The series was sponsored from 1961 to 1963 by Studebaker-Packard Corporation and Studebaker Corporation. At first, sponsorship came from Studebaker's dealer association, with corporate sponsorship coming from South Bend once the series had been picked up by CBS. Studebakers were featured prominently in the show during this period. The Posts are shown owning a 1962 Lark convertible, and the company used publicity shots featuring the Posts and Mister Ed with their product (various cast members also appeared in "integrated commercials" for Lark at the end of the program). When another Lark convertible served as the official pace car at the 1962 Indianapolis 500, Connie Hines attended the race as part of the promotion.

Studebaker's sales dropped dramatically in 1961 and, despite their exposure via sponsoring this program, never recovered. Studebaker ended U.S. motor vehicle production on December 20, 1963. Later, Studebaker's sponsorship and vehicle-supply agreement ended, and The Ford Motor Company provided the vehicles seen on-camera starting at the beginning of 1965. (Studebaker vehicle production ended in March 1966.)

Home media
MGM Home Entertainment released two Best-of collections of Mister Ed on DVD in Region 1. Volume 1 (released January 13, 2004) contains 21 episodes and Volume 2 (released March 8, 2005) contains 20 episodes. Due to poor sales, further volumes were not released.

MGM also released a single-disc release titled Mister Ed's Barnyard Favorites on July 26, 2005, which contains the first eight episodes featured on Volume One.

Shout! Factory announced in June 2009 that they had acquired the rights to release Mister Ed on DVD, and subsequently released the six seasons on DVD in Region 1 in the U.S. Notably, Seasons 4 and 5 are not available outside of the continental U.S. The sixth and final season was released on May 12, 2015.

Syndicated versions of eight episodes were utilized for the Season One DVD release. All other DVD releases contain unedited, full-length versions.

One episode (the second-season episode "Ed the Beneficiary") has lapsed into the public domain. Also in the public domain is a 19-minute production of the United States Department of the Treasury, done in the style of a Mister Ed episode with the show's full cast (but without a laugh track), promoting Savings Bonds, and the original unaired pilot, which was published without a copyright notice.

On December 9, 2014, Shout! Factory released Mister Ed- Complete Series on DVD in Region 1. The 22-disc set contains all 143 episodes (including the eight episodes of season one uncut) of the series as well as bonus features.

♦- Shout! Factory Exclusives title, sold exclusively through Shout's online store

Remakes
In 2004, a remake was planned for the Fox network as a reboot, directed by Michael Spiller and written by Drake Sather. The remake starred Sherman Hemsley as the voice of Mister Ed, David Alan Basche as Wilbur, and Sherilyn Fenn as Carol.

In 2012, Waterman Entertainment announced they were developing a new feature film based on Mister Ed.

Legacy
A race horse named after the character in the television show took part in the 1994 Grand National steeplechase at Aintree, England, but did not complete the course.

In 2007, it was reported that a housing developer intended to create a community near Tahlequah, Oklahoma, built around the supposed final resting place of Mister Ed (who died in 1970). It was intended to be themed to the style of the show and its period.

Mr. Ed is featured in two chapters of Lee Siegel's 2020 novel Horseplay (pp. 107–27).

See also
 List of fictional horses

References

External links

How did they get Mr. Ed to talk? from the Straight Dope
Mister Ed at TV Acres
Interview with Alan Young, October 17, 2007
DVD review of Complete Season 1 and production history

 (2004 remake)

1961 American television series debuts
1966 American television series endings
1960s American sitcoms
American fantasy television series
Black-and-white American television shows
CBS original programming
English-language television shows
Television series about horses
Fantasy comedy television series
First-run syndicated television programs in the United States
Palomino horses
Television series by MGM Television
Talking animals in fiction
Television series by Filmways